The 1979 Campeonato Paulista da Divisão Especial de Futebol Profissional was the 78th season of São Paulo's top professional football league. Corinthians won the championship by the 17th time. Velo Clube was relegated.

Championship
The twenty teams of the championship were divided into four groups of five teams, with each team playing twice against all other teams, and the three best teams of each group passing to the Second phase, and the team with the fewest points out of all the twenty being relegated, while the team with the second-fewest points would dispute a playoff against the runner-up of the Second level. 

In the second phase, the twelve remaining teams would be divided into two groups of six, each team playing once against the teams of its own group and the two best teams of each group qualifying to the Semifinals.

First phase

Série A

Série B

Série C

Série D

Relegation Playoffs

|}

Second phase

Group 1

Group 2

Semifinals

|}

Finals

|}

References

Campeonato Paulista seasons
Paulista